Villa Nellcôte (often referred to as Nellcôte) is a 16-room mansion built during the Belle Époque on a headland above the sea at Villefranche-sur-Mer on the Côte d'Azur in Southern France.

History
In the late 1890s, a former banker, Eugene Thomas, built the imposing villa fronted with marble Ionic columns. Originally it bore the name of Château Amicitia. In 1919, the villa, since renamed Villa Nellcôte, was acquired by the Bordes family, famous shipowners specialising in the transport of sodium nitrate between Chile and France.

Adding infamy to its history, Villa Nellcôte served as the headquarters of the local Gestapo during the Nazi occupation of France in the early 1940s, with the floor vents in the basement reportedly being decorated with swastikas.

The story of Nazi occupation is almost certainly a canard, starting from the swastikas that decorate the heating vents. The swastika, however, was a common motif in Belle Époque designs. The Germans were not in the south of France long enough. From June 1940 to September 1943, Villefranche-sur-Mer was under first Vichy French, then under Fascist Italian control. The Nazi occupation began only after that — and they left again in August 1944. With the war turning against them and an invasion expected on the Côte d'Azur, it seems unlikely that the Germans would have spent those 11 months getting local foundries to make custom cast-iron ventilation grates adorned with a swastika motif. Nor is there any record of a Gestapo HQ in Villefranche-sur-Mer. The Gestapo made its headquarters in Nice, where they tortured resistance members and Jews at the Hermitage and Excelsior.

The Villa Nellcôte was leased from April 1971 to October 1973 by Keith Richards, guitarist of The Rolling Stones. Richards lived in the house only until late August 1971, after which date he left France due to legal problems. When Richards left France, the government ordered him to maintain the rent on the property. On October 15, 1973, Richards was found guilty of trafficking cannabis by a court in Nice; he was given a one-year suspended sentence and a 5,000 franc fine and also banned from entering France for two years.  Recording sessions for the band's critically acclaimed 1972 album Exile on Main St. took place in its basement.

It is presently owned by a Russian national, who purchased it for 100 million euros ($128 million) in 2005.

While the house is not visible from the street, it can be seen from the water.

Notes

Houses completed in the 19th century
French Riviera
Houses in Alpes-Maritimes
Villas in France
1890s establishments in France
Belle Époque